{{DISPLAYTITLE:Omega1 Aquilae}}

Omega1 Aquilae, which is Latinized from ω1 Aquilae, is the Bayer designation for a single star in the equatorial constellation of Aquila. With an apparent visual magnitude of 5.2 it is a faint, yellow-white hued star that can be seen with the naked eye in dark skies. It is drifting closer to the Sun with a radial velocity of −14 km/s.

The spectrum of this star fits a stellar classification of F0 IV. Typically, a luminosity class of IV means that the star is in the subgiant stage. It is rotating rapidly with a projected rotational velocity of 115  km/s. This is causing an equatorial bulge that is 5% larger than the polar radius. The star has 2.85 times the mass of the Sun and five times the Sun's radius. It is radiating 85 times the luminosity of the Sun from its photosphere at an effective temperature of 7,766 K.

References

External links
 Image Omega-1 Aquilae
 HR 7315

F-type subgiants
Aquila (constellation)
Aquilae, 25
Aquilae, Omega1
BD+11 3790
180868
094834
7315